USS Makin Island (LHD-8), a , is the second ship of the United States Navy to be named for Makin Island, target of the Marine Raiders' Makin Island raid early on in the United States' involvement in World War II.

Makin Islands task is to embark, deploy, and land elements of a Marine Corps landing force in an amphibious assault by helicopters, landing craft, and amphibious vehicles. The secondary or convertible mission for Makin Island is sea control and power projection.

Design and construction

Makin Island is the eighth ship of the Wasp class, but features noteworthy technological advances. Changes from the previous LHD design include gas turbine main propulsion engines, all-electric auxiliaries, an advanced machinery control system, water-mist fire-protection systems, and the Navy's most advanced command and control and combat systems equipment. The new propulsion system allows the engines to be directly controlled from the throttles on the bridge, replacing the traditional engine order telegraphs on the earlier Wasp-class LHDs.

Makin Island was laid down on 14 February 2004 at Ingalls Shipbuilding, Pascagoula, Mississippi.

The ship's armament consists of two RIM-116 Rolling Airframe Missile launchers, two RIM-7 Sea Sparrow surface-to-air missile launchers, three Mk 38 25-mm close-in guns, two Mk 15 Phalanx CIWS, four M2 Browning .50 caliber machine guns, and a ceremonial gun.

Makin Island is the eighth Wasp-class amphibious assault ships to be ordered for the U.S. Navy, but differs from her older sister ships in her propulsion system. The previous Wasp-class vessels used steam boilers and steam turbines to drive the propellers, while Makin Island is the first U.S. Navy vessel to use a hybrid propulsion system consisting of a combined diesel electric and gas turbine propulsion system.

Makin Island has two  General Electric LM 2500+ gas turbines each connected to a separate 20:1 ratio main reduction gear, which then drive two  diameter Rolls-Royce controllable pitch propellers. Gas turbines have a high power-to-weight ratio compared to steam or diesel power, but are only efficient near their maximum power output. In Makin Island, the gas turbines are used to power the ship above 12 knots. Below 12 knots, ship propulsion is provided by two  AC electric motors connected to a second input shaft on the main reduction gears. When powered by the electric motors, the gas turbines are decoupled from the main reduction gear and braked to prevent spinning. When the gas turbines are engaged, the electric motors are similarly decoupled from the drive system. The propeller shafts can be driven at lower speeds by slowing down the electric motors. Variable drive speed is achieved with an Alstom variable frequency drive system. Power for the electric motors comes from the ship's service electrical system, which is provided by six 4000 kW generators powered by Fairbanks Morse diesel engines.

In conventional Navy ships, the steam boiler drives both the propellers and ship service steam turbine generators to provide electric power for the vessel. The boilers also provide steam to heat the ship in colder climates. Since Makin Island does not have steam boilers, she uses the diesel electric generators for all shipboard power services. Specifically, instead of steam heating, she uses electric heating for laundry and hot water supply as well as for heating interior compartments in cold climates.

The gas turbine propulsion plant, with all electric auxiliaries, is a program first for large-deck amphibious assault ships and provides significant savings in manpower and maintenance costs associated with traditional steam-powered amphibious ships. The ship carries four reverse-osmosis water-purification systems, each capable of processing  of fresh water per day.

The same propulsion systems experimented with in Makin Island will also be used on the s.

She was christened on 19 August 2006, sponsored by Silke Hagee, wife of General Michael Hagee, Commandant of the Marine Corps, and launched on 15 September 2006. In the aftermath of Hurricane Katrina, U.S. Navy officials announced that several ships under construction at Ingalls Shipbuilding had been damaged by the storm, including Makin Island and two s. The ship's completion was delayed due to rewiring during 2008 to repair incorrect wiring installation.

Service history

2009
Makin Island was delivered to the U.S. Navy on 16 April 2009 and was commissioned at Pascagoula, Mississippi, without ceremony on 26 June 2009 with Captain Bob Kopas in command.

Makin Island deployed 10 July 2009 and sailed around South America via the Strait of Magellan, in which the crew continued to train, obtaining underway certifications in preparation for her arrival in San Diego. During the deployment, Makin Island conducted theater security cooperation activities with Brazil, Chile, and Peru, focusing on working closely with partner nation civilian and maritime forces to share methods and training. She arrived in her home port of San Diego on 14 September 2009. Captain Kopas stated in an interview on local radio that Makin Island had saved about US$2 million in fuel, compared with a conventional propulsion system, on her voyage from Mississippi around South America to San Diego.

Her formal commissioning ceremony took place on 24 October 2009 at Naval Air Station North Island, Coronado, near San Diego. Six USMC veterans of the Makin Island raid attended the ceremony.

2010
Damage to a turning gear delayed the ship's final check-out trials from August to September 2010.

Makin Island visited San Francisco in October 2010 as part of the city's 2010 Fleet Week festivities. She returned to Fleet Week in 2012 after her maiden deployment to the 5th and 7th Fleet area of operations.

2014
On 1 October 2014, during the early months of Operation Inherent Resolve, Makin Island was part of a naval task force in the northern Gulf with the 11th MEU embarked and engaged in active battle operations against ISIS. Shortly after take-off, an MV-22 lost power and dropped towards the water's surface, prompting two of the crew on board to bail out into the water. The pilot was ultimately able to regain control and land, while other aircraft, watercraft, and ships from the task force began search and rescue efforts. One of the two crewmembers was found. The other, a marine NCO, was eventually declared lost, and later determined to be the first American casualty of the operation.

During the December 2014 US hostage rescue operation in Yemen, wounded hostages were flown to the ship for medical treatment while she was posted in the Gulf of Aden.

2016

In October 2016 Makin Island was deployed alongside the US Coast Guard to search for missing Chinese sailor Guo Chuan, who was attempting to break the world record for solo sailing from San Francisco to Shanghai. After searching an area of  without locating the missing sailor, Makin Island's crew recovered his personal items and left the yacht for later salvage.

Hybrid diesel electric propulsion
Makin Island departed on her maiden deployment as the US Navy's first hybrid-drive warship: part gas-turbine and part diesel-electric. About 70% of the time Makin Island can use diesel-electric propulsion, saving on fuel as diesel engines are optimized for cruising, and consume much less fuel than gas turbines. When she needs to travel quickly, at 12 knots or more, the gas turbines are used. This arrangement is also known as combined diesel-electric or gas.

On an average day, Makin Island uses  of fuel, versus  on an older steam ship of its type, according to Captain James Landers, commanding officer.

The downside is the logistical "tail", which means it takes a while to get parts. Further, the ship is software dependent, which is an independent source of failure.

Internal heating is provided by electrical, instead of steam, heaters. At temperatures above  excess heating capacity can be reallocated for additional electric propulsion.

Awards
 Captain Edward F. Ney Memorial Award for outstanding food service - (2012, 2014, 2022)

Notes

References

External links

 
 USS Makin Island page on globalsecurity.org
 USS Makin Island page on navsource.org
 USS Makin Island history page on USCarriers.net

 

Wasp-class amphibious assault ships
Ships built in Pascagoula, Mississippi
2006 ships
Hybrid electric vehicles